is a former Japanese football player. She played for Japan national team.

Club career
Matsuda was born on 26 October 1966. She played for Prima Ham FC Kunoichi.

National team career
On 6 September 1981, when Matsuda was 15 years old, she debuted for Japan national team against England. She played at 1986, 1989, 1991 AFC Championship and 1990 Asian Games. She was also a member of Japan for 1991 World Cup. This competition was her last game for Japan. She played 45 games and scored 10 goals for Japan until 1991.

National team statistics

References

External links
 

1966 births
Living people
Japanese women's footballers
Japan women's international footballers
Nadeshiko League players
Iga FC Kunoichi players
Footballers at the 1990 Asian Games
1991 FIFA Women's World Cup players
Women's association football midfielders
Asian Games silver medalists for Japan
Asian Games medalists in football
Medalists at the 1990 Asian Games